Gravenstafel Ridge is a ridge in Alberta, Canada.

The ridge takes its name from Gravenstafel ridge, in Belgium.  It is near to Mount Haig.

References

Ridges of Alberta